Aage Birch (23 September 1926 – 13 February 2017) was a Danish competitive sailor and Olympic medalist. He won a silver medal in the Dragon class at the 1968 Summer Olympics in Mexico City, together with Poul Lindemark-Jørgensen and Niels Markussen.

References

External links
 
 
 

1926 births
2017 deaths
Danish male sailors (sport)
Sailors at the 1952 Summer Olympics – Dragon
Sailors at the 1960 Summer Olympics – Dragon
Sailors at the 1968 Summer Olympics – Dragon
Olympic sailors of Denmark
Olympic silver medalists for Denmark
Olympic medalists in sailing
Hellerup Sejlklub sailors
Medalists at the 1968 Summer Olympics